Oleksandr Oleksandrovych Aliyev; (born 3 February 1985) is a Ukrainian former professional footballer of Russian origin. He plays as a right midfielder or central midfielder. Known for his spectacular goals from direct free-kicks, his former Dynamo Kyiv coach Yuri Syomin described him as "...the best free-kick taker in Europe". He also was known for being the youngest Dynamo player who debuted in 2002 at professional level when Aliyev was 17 years and 6 months old.

During the 2022 Russian invasion of Ukraine Aliyev joined the Ukrainian army.

Club career
Born in Khabarovsk, Aliyev began playing football as a child with FC Zaria Khabarovsk before entering the Dynamo Kyiv youth system.

Dynamo Kyiv
Aliyev began his career in Borysfen-2 Boryspil (a second team of FC Borysfen Boryspil) in Druha Liha A. It was a youth club that was participating on the professional level similar to FC Dynamo-3 Kyiv and Aliyev at that time was a minor (underage). In 2002, he joined Dynamo Kyiv where he was featured mostly in FC Dynamo-2 Kyiv in the Ukrainian First League. He was really successful in the Dynamo-2 so he was loaned of to Ukrainian Premier League side Metalurh Zaporizhzhia. With Zaporizhzhia, he managed to get to the Ukrainian Cup finals.

After his loan ended, Aliyev was promoted to the main team of Dynamo, where he began to shine especially under new Russian head coach Yuri Semin during the 2008–09 season. In September 2008 Ukraine legend Serhii Rebrov hailed Aliyev's transformation into a "team player", when he thought "Aliyev was just about fun". He was key in Dynamo's campaign in the 2008–09 UEFA Champions League. On 21 October 2008, he scored a free kick from at least 30 yards out to give Dynamo Kyiv the win against FC Porto. On 25 November, at the end of the game against Arsenal, Aliyev pushed the referee, Alain Hamer, and received a red card for his action. Later, during the interview he called Hamer a "kozel" (the goat -eng.) which means similarly to "idiot" in this context. 
Dynamo Kyiv finished third in their Champions League group, moving down to the 2008–09 UEFA Cup after the winter break. Aliyev was an instrumental player throughout the campaign here too. He played in most of the games, helping Dynamo get to the semi-finals, where they were eliminated by fellow Ukrainian rivals, and eventual UEFA Cup Champions Shakhtar Donetsk. Dynamo also won the 2008–09 Ukrainian Premier League that season. Later in 2009–10 season he was a part of starting lineup for Ukrainian Super Cup match against Vorskla Poltava. After a few minutes in that game he got injured and missed few months of the starting season. On recovery Aliyev was not able to secure a starting position and asked for a transfer during the winter break.

Lokomotiv Moscow
As soon as the first half of 2009–10 Ukrainian Premier League Aliyev began negotiations with Lokomotiv Moscow in the Russian Premier League. These negotiations failed and Aliyev remained a Dynamo player until 1 February 2010, when Lokomotiv officially announced the signing of Aliyev to a three-year contract.

Anzhi Makhachkala
In January 2014 Aliyev moved from Dynamo Kyiv to Anzhi Makhachkala on a 2.5-year contract. Aliyev left Anzhi at the end of the 2013–14 season by mutual consent. Shortly thereafter, he re-signed with Anzhi, before having his contract terminated by mutual consent once again in January 2015.

Rukh Vynnyky and amateurs
In 2015 Aliyev returned to Ukraine playing for FC Rukh Vynnyky along with his former teammate Maksim Shatskikh at the 2015 Ukrainian Football Amateur League.

In 2016 and 2017 he was taking part at the Kyiv city championship for local amateur club.

Taraz
In June 2016, after eighteen-months without a professional club, Aliyev signed for FC Taraz of the Kazakhstan Premier League until the end of the 2016 season. Aliyev left Taraz prior to the expiration of his contract on 6 October 2016.

International career

Aliyev played the under-20 2005 FIFA World Youth Championship in Netherlands. He was one of the top scorers of the tournament with five goals, one less than Lionel Messi, the top scorer.
Aliyev also played in the Ukraine national under-21 football team in the 2006 UEFA European Under-21 Football Championship, helping his side reach the final. His set piece goal from more than 40 yards that hit the cross-bar and went in against Turkey in the U-21 Championship has been regarded as one of the best goals in U-21 Football history. He is the current top goalscorer of the Ukrainian under-21 team with eight goals.

On 6 September 2008, Aliyev got his first senior cap for Ukraine. He was substituted on for Maksym Kalynychenko starting from the second half.

Coaching career
In March 2018 Aliyev became a manager of Ukrainian amateur club FC Khmelnytskyi which earlier in 2017 started out at the 2017–18 Ukrainian Football Amateur League.

Career statistics

Club

 included only games played at professional level and might not correspond to the actual record of Football Federation of Ukraine

International

Scores and results list Ukraine's goal tally first, score column indicates score after each Aliyev goal.

Honours

Dynamo Kyiv
 Ukrainian Premier League: 2002–03, 2003–04, 2006–07, 2008–09
 Ukrainian Cup: 2002–03, 2004–05, 2005–06, 2006–07
 Ukrainian Super Cup: 2004, 2006, 2007, 2009

Ukraine U21
 UEFA Under-21 Championship: runner-up 2006

Individual
 Top assist provider of the Ukraine Premier League: 2008–09
 2005 FIFA World Youth Championship:  Silver Shoe

References

External links 
 
 
 
 
 

1985 births
Living people
Footballers from Khabarovsk
Russian footballers
Russian expatriate footballers
Expatriate footballers in Ukraine
Russian expatriate sportspeople in Ukraine
Ukrainian footballers
FC Dynamo Kyiv players
FC Borysfen-2 Boryspil players
FC Dynamo-2 Kyiv players
FC Dynamo-3 Kyiv players
FC Metalurh Zaporizhzhia players
Ukraine international footballers
Ukraine youth international footballers
Ukraine under-21 international footballers
FC Lokomotiv Moscow players
FC Dnipro players
FC Anzhi Makhachkala players
FC Rukh Lviv players
Ukrainian expatriate footballers
Expatriate footballers in Russia
Ukrainian expatriate sportspeople in Russia
Ukrainian Premier League players
Ukrainian First League players
Ukrainian Second League players
Ukrainian Amateur Football Championship players
Russian Premier League players
Russian First League players
Kazakhstan Premier League players
Naturalized citizens of Ukraine
Russian emigrants to Ukraine
UEFA Euro 2012 players
Association football midfielders
FC Taraz players
Ukrainian expatriate sportspeople in Kazakhstan
Expatriate footballers in Kazakhstan
Ukrainian football managers
Ukrainian military personnel of the 2022 Russian invasion of Ukraine